Société Avions Jodel is a French aircraft company started in 1946 by Édouard Joly and his son-in-law Jean Délémontez.

History
Jodel designed a range of light aeroplanes shortly after the Second World War. Popular myth has it that the two industrialists, with no formal aerodynamics training, set about designing a single-seat aircraft with some spare plywood and a small engine, a Poinsard 25hp 2-cyl. The result was the 1948 D9 Bébé (Baby) model. In fact, the two had much experience of building and designing aircraft, Délémontez being a trained aeronautical engineer, and Joly having built an aircraft before the war.

The French government bought many of the aircraft, with more than 500 D9s being built during the next twenty years. Subsequently, the government expressed interest in a larger aircraft as a trainer and the two-seat D11 model followed in 1950.

Jodel aircraft are all-wood, usually made from Sitka spruce and plywood made out of okoume (also known as gaboon), a kind of West African hardwood. Most of the designs are recognisable by their distinctive wings, which have ‘cranked’ dihedral only on the outer third. The wings also incorporate washout, retaining aileron effectiveness at or just prior to the stall. From above or below, the wings are also distinctive as this cranked section of the wing tapers sharply towards the wingtip.

The designs are popular in France and in Southern Europe, UK, but are little known in the USA. In Australia, the design has been brought up to date somewhat by Frank Rogers who produced new drawings to standards suited to Australian amateur builders.

Production under license
Apart from prototypes, Jodels were made by a variety of French aviation manufacturers, but all construction ceased during the 1960s.  Since that time, the Jodel company only sells licences to build its models and detailed plans to amateur builders of homebuilt aircraft.

The Jodel designs were later licensed to the following companies which produced derivative designs that retained the Jodel wing:
 Avions Robin, France
Aero Difusión, Spain
Falconar Avia, Canada

Aircraft
The first model was built in 1948. All Jodel planes have been low-wing monoplanes.
 Jodel D9 1948
 Jodel D91 1948
Jodel D93  1951
 Jodel D11 1950
Jodel D111  	1951
Jodel D112  	1952
Jodel D113  	1960
Jodel D114  1952
SAN Jodel D.150 Mascaret 1962
 Jodel D18 1984
 Jodel D19 1986
Jodel D-20 1990 
 Jodel DR1050 Excellence

References 

  

Aircraft manufacturers of France
Companies based in Occitania (administrative region)